Manatt, Phelps & Phillips, LLP is a Los Angeles-based law firm of more than 450 attorneys and other professionals founded in 1965. The firm earned revenues of $316.9 million in 2017. Donna L. Wilson is the firm's Chief Executive and Managing Partner. On June 11, 2018, Manatt announced that Wilson had been elected to succeed William Quicksilver as the firm’s Chief Executive Officer and Managing Partner. Wilson assumed the leadership role on July 1, 2019, at which time Quicksilver became the Managing Partner Emeritus.

History
Originally a banking law boutique firm, Manatt, Phelps & Phillips LLP was founded by Charles Taylor Manatt, who later became chairman of the Democratic National Committee and U.S. Ambassador to the Dominican Republic, and Thomas Phelps, a banking and finance attorney. Litigation and sports lawyer Alan Rothenberg joined them soon after; Rothenberg remained a named partner in the firm until he moved to Latham & Watkins in 1990.  Former U.S. Senator John V. Tunney was a named partner from 1976 until early 1987. L. Lee Phillips, an entertainment lawyer, joined the firm in 1977 and became a named partner in 1985.  Democratic activist Mickey Kantor joined the firm in 1976; he was a named partner from 1991 until his departure in 1993 to become United States Trade Representative, and, later, Secretary of Commerce during the Clinton Administration.

The firm's headquarters has moved to Century City, Los Angeles, as of March 1, 2020.

Major practice areas
Litigation
Corporate finance
Banking and financial services
Entertainment
Healthcare
Real estate
Advertising, marketing and media
Energy and land use
Government and regulatory policy

Notable alumni

 Ronald Barak (born 1943) (Olympic gymnast)
 John B. Emerson (US Ambassador to Germany)
 Jane Harman
 Mickey Kantor
 Alan Rothenberg
 John V. Tunney
 James R. Jones
 Swami Prem Niren

Notable clients
In advertising: ASICS America Corporation, BBDO, Carnival Corporation, Diageo North America, Dick’s Sporting Goods, Inc., Guthy-Renker, Kia Motors America, Inc., L Brands Inc., Live Nation Entertainment
In energy: California Independent Petroleum Association, Marathon Petroleum, Peabody Energy, PG&E, Southern California Public Power Authority, SunEdison, Sunnova Energy Corporation, TransCanada Corporation, Western Independent Refiners Association
In environment: Dansk Investments (USA Petroleum), GATX, Goodrich, San Gabriel Valley Water Quality Authority
In entertainment: AT&T, BMG Rights Management, CBS, Inc., Cold War Kids, Concord Music Group, Daniel Lanois, Death Cab for Cutie, Diplo, Dirty Projectors, Earth, Wind & Fire, Estate of Rick James, Gallant, George Benson, Huayi Brothers Media, Ingrooves, Jennifer Nettles, Kobalt Music Publishing America, Lyle Lovett, Mad Decent, Major Lazer, Miike Snow, Neil Young, ODESZA, Papa Roach, Pepe Aguilar, Perfect World Pictures, Sony Music Entertainment, Sony Pictures Entertainment, Styx, Thievery Corporation, The Pretty Reckless, Tracy Chapman, Warner/Chappell Music, Warner Music Group
In financial services: AvidBank Holdings, BMO Financial Group, Cross River Bank, CVB Financial Corp., Houlihan Lokey, Inc., Impac Mortgage Holdings, Inc., Keefe, Bruyette & Woods, Inc., Nano Banc, PennyMac Loan Services, PNC Bank, Preferred Bank, Presidio Bank, Piper Sandler Companies (fka Sandler O’Neill + Partners, L.P.)
In fintech: BlueVine Capital, Cadence, CircleUp, Cross River Bank, Groundfloor Finance, IdeaFinancial, Lendeavor, LendingHome, LiftForward, MoneyLion, Platinum Auto, Trade River, Varo Money, Wunder Capital
In government: AltaMed Health Services Corporation, AT&T, Cedars-Sinai Medical Center, Honeywell, Intel Corporation, Memorial Sloan Kettering Cancer Center, New York University, Oracle USA, Siemens, State Compensation Insurance Fund, Toyota Motor North America
In healthcare: Aetna, Ascension Health, Blue Shield of California, Dignity Health, Kaiser Family Foundation, Maimonides, NYC Health + Hospitals Corp., Tenet Healthcare, Robert Wood Johnson Foundation, UCLA Health System, UCSF Medical Center, University of Chicago Medical Center
In intellectual property: NBC Universal, Inc., Warner/Chappell Music, Eurostar, Herbalife International Inc., Credit One Bank, N.A., Alliance Healthcare Services, Inc., LivOn Laboratories, KCETLink, Yoobi
In real estate: Avanath Capital Management, Bohannon Development Corp., Carmel Partners, Dignity Health, Facebook, Inc., Jay Paul Company, Kennedy Wilson, Lowe Enterprises, Inc., PIMCO, TH Real Estate Investments LLC, The Macerich Company, Olive Hill Group, Trammell Crowe Residential
In retail and consumer products: Del Taco, El Pollo Loco, New York and Company, Polo Ralph Lauren Corporation, Tawa Supermarket

Pro bono work
Manatt's pro bono program ranked No. 23 in The American Lawyer'''s 2019 Pro Bono Report. The average pro bono hours per Manatt lawyer is 73.7 hours.

Holocaust Survivors Justice Network

In 2007, Manatt and Bet Tzedek launched a nationwide pro bono program, the Holocaust Survivors Justice Network, to help holocaust survivors. The Network has since assisted thousands of survivors and has grown to be the single largest coordinated pro bono effort in U.S. history. At the height of its activity in 2009, clinics operated in 31 cities across the country with the assistance of more than 100 corporate partners, providing free legal services to survivors seeking German "Ghetto Work" reparations. The Network has been recognized by the American Bar Association, the National Law Journal and the Pro Bono Institute.

Significant matters
In 2019, Manatt successfully challenged the attempted addition of a citizenship question on the 2020 U.S. census. The court ruled that Secretary Wilbur Ross's decision to add a citizenship question to the Census was both unlawful and unconstitutional, violating not only the Administrative Procedure Act, but also the Enumeration Clause of the United States Constitution. 
Led the charge on a mandamus action on behalf of 46 affirmative asylum petitioners whose interviews had not been scheduled in accordance with federal regulations, which proved to be a challenging test case since the government adopted its "first-in-first-out" process. Immigration Equality recognized Manatt's work in 2016 with a "Safe Haven" award.
Advanced the issue of transgender rights in the immigration law context by persuading a Ninth Circuit panel to grant relief to a transgender Mexican woman in the U.S. With the Public Law Center, Manatt secured a victory in 2015 for transgender immigrants seeking relief from torture when the Ninth Circuit suspended the deportation of a transgender Mexican woman. The opinion in Avendano-Hernandez v. Lynch is far-reaching because it distinguishes gender identity from sexual orientation, identifies the unique vulnerabilities faced by transgender individuals, and recognizes that the Convention Against Torture does not require acquiescence of a higher level of government when low-level public officials commit torture.
Affirmed by the 9th Circuit Court of Appeals in 2014, Manatt represented female high school athletes on a pro bono basis in a Title IX class action against Eastern San Diego County's Sweetwater Union High School District. This was the first Title IX K-12-level case to ever go to trial, and it is the first case in which a class of high school female athletes has won a summary judgment motion under Title IX on the issue of failure to provide equal participation opportunities to girls.
In 2012, Manatt lawyers and staff spent more than 1,300 hours assisting clients of the Inner City Law Center, the only provider of legal services on skid row in downtown Los Angeles. In June 2013, the center presented Manatt and partner Margaret Levy with the Humanitarian Award for their consistent support.
In late 2010, Manatt secured a landmark victory on behalf of a pro bono client who was victimized by policies and practices of her high school and its administrative district. The U.S. District Court ruled in favor of client Desiree R., then a 17-year-old high school senior, in a precedent-setting Americans with Disabilities Act case.
Manatt secured a victory in an environmental battle to safeguard the rights and quality of life for residents of McCloud, California, against Nestlé Waters North America. In September 2009, Nestlé abandoned its plans to build a million-square-foot bottling plant that was opposed by environmentalists and McCloud residents. Manatt received the National Law Journal's Pro Bono Award for the second consecutive year in 2010 for its work with McCloud.

Rankings and recognitions
Manatt is an AmLaw 200 ranked firm, listed at number 107 on the 2019 list. The firm also appears in:

Chambers and Partners: 24 firm lawyers and 9 firm practices were ranked for 2019.U.S. News'': 11 Tier 1 national rankings and 30 Tier 1 metropolitan designations were received for 2020. The firm was once again named the "Law Firm of the Year" for Entertainment Law - Music.
Best Lawyers in America: 64 Manatt attorneys were named to the guide for 2019.
The Legal 500: 12 Manatt practices are nationally ranked in the 2019 edition, including a Tier 1 national ranking in healthcare. The firm's Healthcare group also won the "Healthcare: service providers team of the year" 2015 award from The Legal 500 United States.

Organizations promoting workplace diversity include:

Women In Law Empowerment Forum: Manatt has received WILEF's Gold Standard Certificate for eight of the last nine years. [2011-2017, 2019]
American Lawyer: Manatt ranked 66 out of 227 surveyed U.S. law firms in The American Lawyer's 2018 Diversity Scorecard.
Working Mother named Manatt to its 2019 list of the 50 best law firms for women in the country for the eleventh time in the last twelve years the firm has made this list.
Human Rights Campaign: Manatt earned a perfect score on the HRC's 2019 Corporate Equality Index.

Manatt Health
Manatt Health is a division of Manatt. Manatt Health professionals provide counsel on healthcare coverage and access, healthcare information technology, healthcare financing and reimbursement, and healthcare restructuring.

Manatt Health is composed of healthcare consultants, lawyers, project managers, technology strategists, analysts and policy advisors. They frequently publish by-lined articles and speak with media on major health industry issues. Clients include hospitals, payers, physician practices, state policymakers and agencies, foundations, associations, and technology companies.

In January 2016, the group added Chiquita Brooks-LaSure as a managing director. She is a former deputy center director and deputy director for policy and regulation at the Centers for Consumer Information and Insurance Oversight, Centers for Medicare and Medicaid Services. Other notable professionals include Deborah Bachrach, former director of New York State Medicaid and Deputy Commissioner of Health; Cindy Mann, former Deputy Administrator and Director of the U.S. Center for Medicaid and CHIP Services; Joel Ario, former director of the U.S. Department of Health & Human Services' Office of Health Insurance Exchange,; and Jonah P.B. Frohlich, California's Former Deputy Secretary of Health Information Technology.

Recent work
A proposal from the Iowa Hospital Association, created in partnership with Manatt Health in early 2018, is seeking to change the state's Medicaid system, moving it away from the current private management model. 
In a report for the Robert Wood Johnson Foundation, Manatt Health explored how cities and counties have launched local initiatives to address the human and economic impact of untreated serious mental illness and substance use disorders. The report concludes with a look at opportunities for evaluation and spread of successful models. 
Manatt Health was hired in February 2016 to work with New York City's Health + Hospitals Corporation to look into how it could benefit from state reforms and national trends. Mayor de Blasio, during his budget presentation, promised to address Health + Hospitals Corporation, which faces a multi-billion dollar deficit. 
For the Association of American Medical Colleges, Manatt Health advised on and coauthored the landmark 2014 report "Advancing the Academic Health System for the Future," which articulated a vision and recommendations for academic health centers as they seek to transform into systems responsive to the changing clinical environment and able to continue to invest in teaching and research missions.
In August 2014, Manatt Health authored a white paper for The Commonwealth Fund that examined states' efforts to promote integrated care delivery as part of their efforts to deliver high-quality, cost-effective care to Medicaid beneficiaries with comorbid physical and behavioral health conditions ("State Strategies for Integrating Physical and Behavioral Health Services in a Changing Medicaid Environment").

Manatt Financial Services
Manatt Financial Services is a separate division of Manatt.  In June 2019, longstanding California Department of Business Oversight Commissioner Jan Lynn Owen joined Manatt Financial Services as a senior advisor.  Lawyers from Manatt Financial Services edit and co-author the leading annual desk treatise on consumer financial services law.

Manatt Digital
In May 2013, Manatt launched Manatt Digital to serve as a one-stop, full-service legal and business consulting division for clients in the digital media, entertainment and advertising industries. Services include business consulting, partner negotiations, venture capital, strategic relationship-building and artist access, creative deal-making and mergers and acquisitions.

Manatt Digital Media Ventures

Manatt Digital Media Ventures aims to cultivate start-ups and growth companies in and around the digital media landscape.

Manatt Digital Media Ventures makes 10-15 investments a year in early-stage companies. The firm's partners provide capital annually and also have the opportunity to personally invest alongside the fund. Since 2000, Manatt has made more than 90 investments in companies and funds focused on digital media, including Etsy, MaxPreps, Pinterest and DFJ Frontier.

Offices
 Los Angeles
 New York City
 San Francisco
 Washington, D.C.
 Chicago
 Boston
 Orange County
 Palo Alto
 Sacramento
 Albany

References 

Law firms established in 1965
Law firms based in Los Angeles